Charles, Charlie or Chuck Thomas may refer to:

Military
Charles L. Thomas (Medal of Honor, 1865) (1843–1923), United States Army soldier awarded the Medal of Honor for heroism
Charles L. Thomas (1920–1980), United States Army officer posthumously awarded the Medal of Honor
Charles Mitchell Thomas (1846–1908), admiral in the United States Navy
Charles Thomas, Prince of Vaudémont (1670–1704), fieldmarshal in the Austrian army
Charles Thomas, Prince of Löwenstein-Wertheim-Rosenberg (1783–1849), Austrian officer during the Napoleonic Wars
Charles W. Thomas (general), retired U.S. Army officer and defense industry executive
Charles W. Thomas (captain) (1903–1973), flag officer in the United States Coast Guard
Charles Thomas (Canadian admiral) (born 1936), Canadian admiral
Charles Thomas (1797–1878), acting quartermaster general during the American Civil War]]

Politics and government
Charles Thomas (Delaware governor) (1790–1848), American lawyer and Governor of Delaware
Charles Thomas (Secretary of the Navy) (1897–1983), U.S. Secretary of the Navy
Charles G. Thomas (1835–1916), American politician, Wisconsin State Assemblyman
Charles R. Thomas (1827–1891), American politician and representative from North Carolina
Charles M. Thomas (judge) (c. 1844/1846–1895), justice of the Dakota Territorial Supreme Court
Charles R. Thomas (1861–1931), American politician and representative from North Carolina
Sir Charles Inigo Thomas (1846–1929), English civil servant and Permanent Secretary to the Admiralty
Charles S. Thomas (Virginia politician), (died 1894) American politician, member of the Virginia House of Delegates
Charles S. Thomas (1849–1934), American politician, U.S. Senator and governor of Colorado
Charlie Thomas (politician) (1915–1976), politician, New Brunswick member of Canadian Parliament
Charles H. Thomas (diplomat) (1934–1998), United States ambassador to Hungary
Charles John Howell Thomas, English civil servant and diplomat
Charles Wimbledon Thomas, Fijian businessman and politician

Science and technology
Charles Thomas (mine agent) (1794–1868), Cornish mining innovator
Charles Xavier Thomas (1785–1870), French inventor and entrepreneur
Charles Allen Thomas (1900–1982), American chemist and businessman
Charles Thomas Thomas (1820–1867), English-Canadian stone carver and builder

Sports
Charlie Thomas (rugby union) (1864–1948), Welsh international rugby player
Charles Thomas (American football) (1871–1920), American football player and coach
Charles Thomas (footballer) (1876–1935), Druids F.C. and Wales international footballer
Chuck Thomas (American football) (born 1960), professional American football player
Charles Thomas (basketball, born 1969), American professional basketball player
Charles Thomas (basketball, born 1986), American professional basketball player
Charles Thomas (baseball) (born 1978), left fielder in Major League Baseball
Charles Thomas (athlete) (1931–2015), American former sprinter
Charlie Thomas, former owner of the Houston Rockets
Charles H. Thomas (sports executive) (1876–1968), one-time president of the Chicago Cubs
Charles Thomas (umpire) (1840–1923), South African cricket umpire
Charley Thomas (baseball), Negro leagues baseball player

Other uses
Charlie Thomas (director) (born 1961), British documentary maker and sports presenter
Charles Thomas (historian) (1928–2016), professor of Cornish Studies at Exeter University
Charlie Thomas (musician) (1937–2023), American rhythm and blues singer, most notably in The Drifters
Charles John Thomas (1832–1919), director of the Mormon Tabernacle Choir
Charles Armand Étienne Thomas (1857–1892), French painter
Charles C. Thomas, medical publisher and owner of the Dana–Thomas House
Charles Thomas, Prince of Löwenstein-Wertheim-Rochefort (1714–1789)
Charles Drayton Thomas (1867–1953), British Methodist minister and spiritualist
Charles John Thomas, director of the Mormon Tabernacle Choir

See also
Charlie Thomas (Australian footballer) (Charlotte Thomas, born 2003), Australian rules footballer